Buck Creek is a stream in Morgan County in the U.S. state of Missouri. It is a tributary to the Osage River within the Lake of the Ozarks.

The stream headwaters arise at  within the community of Laurie and adjacent to Missouri Route 5. Prior to the impoundment of the lake, the Buck Creek confluence with the Osage River was approximately two miles to the east.

Buck Creek was so named due to the sightings of bucks by early settlers in the area.

See also
List of rivers of Missouri

References

Rivers of Morgan County, Missouri
Rivers of Missouri